Gyaltsab is a Tibetan word meaning "regent". The title specifically refers to the following religious figures:

Gyaltsab Je (1364-1432), the first Ganden Tripa;
Goshir Gyaltsab, a lineage of Karma Kagyu tulkus, the most recent of whom was born in 1954.